The Swedish Hare is a breed of domestic rabbit that resembles a hare and was developed, starting in 2008 in Sweden, for its competitive jumping ability. At the same time but separately, the Elfin breed was being developed in the United States—also in response to the popularity of rabbit show jumping. The Elfin officially became the Swedish Hare in October 2011.

Specimens from all rabbit breeds may do well in rabbit sports, but the Swedish Hare breed specifically combines the athleticism and temperament to excel in jumping competitions, while avoiding extremes of body type, fur length, or ear length. Since coat colors and markings do not affect jumping ability, all are acceptable in the Swedish Hare; in fact, unusual coats are encouraged because (like racing silks) they help distinguish the competitors.  

In Sweden, the landrace breed called the Gotland, although rare, was admired for its good temperament and strong body. Many Gotland rabbits possess an athletic arched body type, and, as a bonus, the breed comes in all colors. Good Gotland jumpers were bred to the European version of the Polish rabbit, the Belgian Hare and other breeds to develop the Swedish Hare.

In the United States, outgoing temperament and athletic body type were paramount in developing the Elfin rabbit. Arched and muscular but large Rhinelanders were bred to the American version of the smaller Polish breed to bring the size. Other foundation stock included the Belgian Hare, the Tan, the Harlequin, the Mini Satin, and the Britannia Petite. Now that the Elfin have been included in the Swedish Hare population, an international exchange of breeding stock is possible.

Appearance

General appearance is to be graceful, fully arched and well balanced. The Swedish standard is similar and is being translated into English.  

Schedule Of Points
General Type........................................     75
Fur........................................................     10
Color.......................................................       5
Condition...............................................     10
Total.....................................................   100

Showroom Classes & Weights
Senior Bucks & Does—6 months of age and over. Maximum weight 5 pounds.
Junior Bucks & Does—Under 6 months of age.

Note: The Elfin should be judged in a natural position, not posed. 

General Type--Points 75: General appearance is to be graceful, fully arched and well balanced. Should be slim, athletic, and well up on their front legs. Body long and fine with a muscular flank well tucked up. Back distinctly arched with the loins and hindquarters well rounded. Neck should be in balance with the body and blending smoothly into the shoulder. Viewed from above the body should taper from shoulders to a slightly wider hip.
Faults—Protruding, flat, or undercut hips; weak shoulders; heavy shoulders. Weight over 5 pounds.
Disqualifications From Competition—Not arch type.

Temperament--Elfin temperament should be alert and active. They should exhibit curiosity and friendliness.
Faults—Any temperament less than gentle, bold and confident. Growling or unwillingness to be handled. Fear. 
Disqualifications From Competition—Aggression. Biting. A cranky rabbit having a "bad day" will be disqualified for that day.

Head--The head should [be] medium long and fine, slightly wider between the eyes.
Faults—Wide, round head. Extreme narrowness or pinched muzzle.  Weakness.

Ears--Ears should be carried erect and should be in overall balance with the body and legs. Should be roughly the same length as the distance from the base of the ears to the nose.  Set well together carried erect on top of the head.
Faults—Excessively long or short ears relative to body. Lopped ears.
Disqualifications From Competition—Ears that interfere with movement or rabbit sports. 

Eyes--Bright and bold, well positioned on upper side of head. Any color or combination of color.

Feet and Legs--Fore feet are long, fine in bone and perfectly straight. The hind feet are long, fine and flat. Muscular and strong, in balance with an athletic body.
Faults—Short thick legs, weak legs.

Tail--Straight; length in balance with body. 

Fur--Points  10: Flyback coat; should be short and fine and lie very close to the body.
Faults—Any other fur type.

Color--Points 5: Any color is accepted. Attractive.  
Disqualifications From Competition—No color or pattern disqualifications. No toenail color disqualifications.

Condition--Points 5: Clean and firm of flesh. The Elfin should appear alert, sprightly and vigorous.
Faults—Obese or underfed.

See also

List of rabbit breeds

References

External links
Swedish Hare (in Swedish, but some great photos.)
Gotland Rabbit (Sweden)
Gallery of Swedish Hare photos

Rabbit breeds